Ron Jones (born 1948) is a British businessman and executive chair of Tinopolis, one of the UK's largest television production companies.

Previously a partner in the accounting and consultancy firm Arthur Andersen.  He was a founder of Tinopolis in 1990 and has led the company since that time. Jones took the company public in 2005 and this led to a rapid expansion by acquisition, including a hostile takeover of the largest listed production company at that time, The Television Corporation PLC. In 2008 Jones and his management team bought the company back in partnership with Vitruvian Partners, a private equity company.

Jones is a former member of the Sports Council for Wales (now Sport Wales) and the Welsh Language Board.  He was treasurer of Glamorgan County Cricket Club for nine years, and is a director and former chairman of Llanelli Scarlets, the leading rugby union club.

References
 Guardian newspaper profile
 Ron Jones takes Tinopolis private again
  Bank of Scotland Entrepreneur Challenge, 2008: Ron Jones

External links
Ron Jones profile at Tinopolis

1948 births
Living people
21st-century Welsh businesspeople
20th-century Welsh businesspeople
Welsh television executives
Tinopolis